A gask is a student party in Sweden.

Gask may also refer to:
 Gask, Iran, a village Sistan & Baluchestan Province
 Gask, Kerman, Iran, a village 
 Gask Ridge, Roman fortifications in Scotland
 Gask Hill, Scotland, a rarely-climbed hill
 Gask (surname)